The Aboriginal Shire of Cherbourg is a local government area in Wide Bay–Burnett, Australia. In June 2018, it had an estimated population of 1,315.

Geography 
The Aboriginal Shire of Cherbourg is completely surrounded by the South Burnett Region. The shire includes the town of Cherbourg.

History 
The name Cherbourg derives from the parish name, which takes its name the original 1840s pastoral run name, which is believed to be a corruption of Chirbury, a town in Shropshire, England, the birthplace of pastoralist Richard Jones who leased the pastoral run in the 1850s.

In , the shire had a population of around 1,241 people, making it Queensland's third largest Aboriginal community. The town is located on traditional lands that belong to the 'Wakka Wakka' (Waka Waka), people, but many different clan groups are also represented, including 'Gubbi Gubbi' (Kabi Kabi) people. A sign on entry to the town reads "Many Tribes, One Community".  In 2006, median individual income for residents of Cherbourg was $227 per week, less than half the national median.  98.8% of housing in the town is stand-alone houses. The community participates in Work for the Dole scheme. Unemployment in the town is high as there is very little genuine work to be found in the town or in nearby Murgon. Results from 2006 census survey reported 31.4% of the workforce was employed full-time while 49.5% worked part-time and 5.8% were unemployed.

Mayors 

 2020–present: Elvie Jean Sandow Jnr

References

External links 

 
Cherboug
Aboriginal communities in Queensland